The Basilica of Saint Anthony of Padua al Laterano is a Roman Catholic titular church in Rome on Via Merulana, one block from the Obelisk of St. John Lateran.  It was built for the Order of Friars Minor, who needed a new home after they were moved from Santa Maria in Ara Coeli to allow the construction of the Victor Emmanuel II Monument.

The church was consecrated on 4 December 1887 and was elevated to minor basilica status in 1931.

On 12 March 1960 Pope John XXIII made it a titular church as a seat for cardinals.
The most recent cardinal priest of the Titulus Sancti Antonii Patavini de Urbe  was Cláudio Hummes.

Architecture 
Two staircases provide access to the gantry of the church, where a statue of Saint Anthony of Padua stands holding the Christ Child. Inside, the church is constructed of three naves, divided by two columns of pillars made of pink marble. The general decoration of the church was done by Friar Bonaventura Loffredo da Alghero in 1889–1890.  The fresco of the apotheosis of the Franciscan family in the apse area of the sanctuary was done by Friar Loffredo.

The paintings of the side altars were done by various artists, mainly Franciscan: St. Clare of Assisi by Giuseppe Bravi (1844–1908); St. Francis of Assisi by Franz De Rhoden (1817–1903); Japanese Martyrs crucified in 1597 in Nagasaki by Cesare Mariani (1826–1901); Immaculate Mary by Francesco Szoldatiez (1916); St. Ludovico di Tolosa by Eugenia Pignet (1940). Other paintings were done by the friars Giuseppe Maria Rossi, Caio D' Andrea and Michelangelo Cianti.

List of cardinal priests 
 Peter Doi (28 March 1960 – 21 February 1970)
 António Ribeiro (5 March 1973 – 24 March 1998)
 Cláudio Hummes (21 February 2001 – 4 July 2022)

See also
 Basilica of Saint Anthony of Padua, in Padua

Notes

References
 Benedetto Pesci, OFM, "Storia della Basilica di S. Antonio" in Official Website of the Basilica: Basilica di Sant'Antonio al Laterano, Roma
 Mariano Armellini, Le chiese di Roma dal secolo IV al XIX, Roma 1891
 C. Rendina, Le Chiese di Roma, Newton & Compton Editori, Milano 2000, p. 37
 C. Cerchiai, Rione XV Esquilino, in AA.VV, I rioni di Roma, Newton & Compton Editori, Milano 2000, Vol. III, pp. 968–1014

External links 

Roman Catholic churches completed in 1888
19th-century Roman Catholic church buildings in Italy
Basilica churches in Rome
Titular churches
Franciscan churches in Italy
Churches of Rome (rione Esquilino)